In phonetics and phonology, apheresis is the loss of a word-initial vowel producing a new form called aphetism (e.g. American >  'Merican). In a broader sense, it can refer to the loss of any initial sound (including consonants) from a word or, in a less technical sense, to the loss of one or more sounds from the beginning of a word.

Etymology
Apheresis comes from Greek ἀφαίρεσις aphairesis, "taking away" from ἀφαιρέω aphaireo from ἀπό apo, "away" and αἱρέω haireo, "to take". Aphetism comes from Greek ἄφεσις aphesis, "letting go" from ἀφίημι aphiemi from ἀπό apo, "away" and ἵημι híemi, "send forth".

Historical sound change
In historical phonetics and phonology, the term "apheresis" is often limited to the loss of an unstressed vowel. The Oxford English Dictionary gives that particular kind of apheresis the name aphesis (from Greek ἄφεσις).

Loss of unstressed vowel 
 > Vulgar Latin: *(e)biscopus >  'bishop'
English:  acute > cute
English: because → informal 'cause
 >  'Gypsy'
English: alone > lone
English: amend > mend
 > Middle English:  'vanish'

Loss of any sound
English: [k]nife → 
Portuguese: estar > colloquial tar
Proto-Norse: *[st]randa >  >  'beach'
  >  'Spain'
Old English:  > English: knee →

Poetic device
English it is > poetic 'tis
English upon > 'pon
English eleven > 'leven

Informal speech

Synchronic apheresis is more likely to occur in informal speech than in careful speech: 'scuse me vs. excuse me, How 'bout that? and How about that? It typically supplies the input enabling acceptance of apheresized forms historically, such as especially > specially. The result may be doublets, such as especially and specially, or the pre-apheresis form may fail to survive (Old French  > English scarce). An intermediate status is common in which both forms continue to exist but lose their transparent semantic relationship: abate 'decrease, moderate', with bate now confined to the locution with bated breath 'with breath held back'.

See also

 Apocope
 Elision
 Initial dropping
 List of phonetics topics
 Syncope

References

Notes

Bibliography
Alexander, James D. 1988. Aphesis in English. Word 39.29-65
Crowley, Terry (1997). An Introduction to Historical Linguistics. 3rd edition. Oxford University Press.

Figures of speech
Sound changes
Phonotactics